The Vossloh DE 18 is a Bo′Bo′ diesel-electric locomotive. It is the first new diesel-electric locomotive to be built in Kiel since production of the DE 1002 ended in 1993. Up to 60% of the components are shared with the diesel-hydraulic G 18.

Operations
The prototype locomotive was shown together with the smaller, diesel-hydraulic G 12 on InnoTrans 2010. The launch customer for the DE 18 was BASF, ordering 2 DE 18 locomotives for services at its plants in December 2011.

References

External links
 Official Vossloh DE 18 product page

DE 18
Railway locomotives introduced in 2010
Bo′Bo′ locomotives
Standard gauge locomotives of Germany